The 1977 Pot Black was a professional invitational snooker tournament, which was held in the Pebble Mill Studios in Birmingham, and this year, the tournament expanded from 8 to 12 players. All matches were one-frame shoot-outs.

Broadcasts were on BBC2 and started at 21:00 on Friday 7 January 1977  Alan Weeks presented the programme with Ted Lowe as commentator and Sydney Lee as referee.

With 12 players now competing in this series, The round robin format has now become 4 groups of 3 players. The two debutants Perrie Mans and Doug Mountjoy faced each other in the final which Mans won 90-21.

Main draw

The draw for the group stages was done by Denis Howell, the Minister of Sport and shown before the first match.

Group 1

Group 2

Group 3

Group 4

Knockout stage

References

Pot Black
1977 in snooker
1977 in English sport